The Free Social Constitutional Party or Al-Hizb Al-Distouri is a political party in Egypt. The Free Social Constitutional Party might be considered as a liberal democratic and a liberal socialist party.

Platform 
 Drafting a new Constitution.
 Reforming education.
 Reforming the health sector.
 Creating a favorable investment atmosphere, ensuring swift justice, eliminating red tape, reducing taxes and providing high-quality services.
 Supervising the State Budget
 Approving the appointment of senior State officials by the People's Assembly.
 Establishing a poor bank.

See also 
Liberalism
Contributions to liberal theory
Liberalism worldwide
List of liberal parties
Liberal democracy
Liberalism in Egypt

References

External links 
Free Social Constitutional Party on Egypt State Information Service (SIS)

Liberal parties in Egypt
Liberal socialism
Political parties established in 2004
Socialist parties in Egypt
2004 establishments in Egypt